Orsillini is a tribe of seed bugs in the family Lygaeidae.  The type genus is Orsillus.

Genera
BioLib lists:
 Aborsillus Barber, 1954
 Austronysius Ashlock, 1967
 Belonochilus Uhler, 1871
 Camptocoris Puton, 1886
 Eurynysius Ashlock, 1967
 Neortholomus Hamilton, 1983
 Orsillus Dallas, 1852
 Ortholomus Stål, 1872
 Sinorsillus Usinger, 1938

References

 Thomas J. Henry, Richard C. Froeschner. (1988). Catalog of the Heteroptera, True Bugs of Canada and the Continental United States. Brill Academic Publishers.

Further reading

 

Lygaeidae